Edessan Rite or East Syriac Rite is an Eastern Christian liturgical rite.

Edessan Rite may also refer to:

 Liturgy of Addai and Mari
 Anaphora of Sharar or Third Anaphora of Peter, employed in the Maronite Church of Antioch